KHAC (880 AM) is a radio station broadcasting a Native American religious format that is licensed to Tse Bonito, New Mexico, United States. The station is currently owned by Across Nations.

When it first came on the air in 1967 KHAC was on 1300 kHz as a daytimer. It moved to 1110 kHz in 1979 and moved to 880 kHz in 1989.

References

External links

Moody Radio affiliate stations
HAC